Austrian Lloyd may refer to
 a major shipping company of Imperial Austria, founded in 1833, see Österreichischer Lloyd
 a Cypriot company founded in 1991 or 1951, see Austrian Lloyd Ship Management